Tampines North Bus Interchange is a bus interchange serving Tampines in Singapore. Operated by SBS Transit, the bus interchange is located along Tampines Street 62.

The bus interchange opened on 27 November 2022 and features wheelchair-friendly facilities for the disabled. The new interchange is designed by SDA Architects.

The bus interchange will be a part of the upcoming Tampines North Integrated Transport Hub and will provide rail connections with the future Tampines North MRT station.

History
The interchange was built at a cost of about S$12.8 million and were opened on Sunday, 27 November 2022. The interchange provides bus connections to Tampines North estate. Bus Service 18 and 129 was the first bus routes to serve Tampines North Bus Interchange, which previously terminated at Tampines Concourse Bus Interchange prior to being amended to their current route.

Bus contracting model 
Under the new bus contracting model, all the bus routes terminating at the interchange are under the Tampines Bus Package.

References

External links
 

Bus stations in Singapore
2022 establishments in Singapore
Tampines